A by-election was held for the Australian House of Representatives seat of Capricornia on 30 September 1967. This was triggered by the death of Labor MP George Gray.

The by-election was won by Labor candidate Doug Everingham.

Results

References

Capricornia by-election 1967
Queensland federal by-elections
Capricornia by-election 1967